{{Infobox sportsperson
| image = TAJINDER PAL SINGH TOOR Won Silver For India In Shotput.jpg
| image_size = 
| caption = Toor with the silver medal at the 2017 Asian Athletics Championships
| name = Tajinderpal Singh Toor
| event = Shot put
| club = 
| collegeteam = 
| birth_date = 
| birth_place = Khosa Pando, Moga district, Punjab, India
| country = India
| pb = 21.49m (2021) NR
| medaltemplates = 

}}Tajinderpal Singh Toor''' (born 13 November 1994) is an Indian shot putter who holds the outdoor Asian and national record of 21.49m.

Early life
Toor was born on 13 November 1994 in Khosa Pando village in Moga district, Punjab. Hailing from a family of farmers, he switched from cricket to shot put at the insistence of his father.

Career
In June 2017, Toor recorded his personal best outdoor throw of 20.40m at the Federation Cup National Senior Athletics Championships in Patiala, but fell short of the World Championships qualification standard of 20.50m. In the following month, he won the silver medal at the 2017 Asian Athletics Championships in Bhubaneswar with a throw of 19.77m, missing out on the gold medal by 0.03m.

Toor finished eighth in the final of the 2018 Commonwealth Games with a throw of 19.42m.

In August 2018, Toor won gold at the 2018 Asian Games with a 20.75m throw, breaking the Games record and the national record. He won the gold medal at the 2019 Asian Athletics Championships in Doha with a throw of 20.22m.

Toor qualified for the 2020 Summer Olympics by registering a throw of 21.49m at the Indian Grand Prix IV in June 2021, clearing the 21.10m entry standard. This throw also broke the national and Asian records. Competing with a heavily-bandaged shoulder at the Olympics, Toor registered only one legal throw of 19.99m in qualifying and failed to reach the final round.

At the 2022 Indian Open Nationals, he was adjudged the best male athlete.

References

External links
 

Living people
1994 births
Indian male shot putters
Athletes from Punjab, India
People from Moga district
Athletes (track and field) at the 2018 Asian Games
Asian Games medalists in athletics (track and field)
Asian Games gold medalists for India
Medalists at the 2018 Asian Games
Asian Athletics Championships winners
Asian Games gold medalists in athletics (track and field)
Recipients of the Arjuna Award
Athletes (track and field) at the 2018 Commonwealth Games
Commonwealth Games competitors for India
Athletes (track and field) at the 2020 Summer Olympics
Olympic athletes of India